Sainte-Marie is a town and the fifth-largest commune in the French overseas department of Martinique. It is located on the northeast (Atlantic Ocean) side of the island of Martinique.

Geography

Climate

Sainte-Marie has a tropical rainforest climate (Köppen climate classification Af).

Population

See also
Communes of Martinique

References

External links
 Official website (in French)

Communes of Martinique
Populated places in Martinique